The Student Price Card, also known as SPC Card, is a student loyalty discount program in Canada offering discounts and deals on items such as fashion, food, shoes, and travel and more. Students show their SPC Card at participating locations to receive instant savings every time they shop. Offers vary by participating partner locations.

The program's membership include elementary through post-secondary level students throughout Canada. The program has a reported 1,100,000 members and 120+ participating retail chains. The SPC Card is a fee-based annual loyalty program, valid from August 1 until July 31 the following year.

Banking partner
Since August 2019, CIBC is the banking partner for SPC. Students with an eligible bank account or credit product receive free SPC membership.

The company previously partnered with BMO Bank of Montreal for a BMO SPC MasterCard, offering either Air Miles or cash back for credit card purchases, in addition to no annual fee and a free SPC membership. The credit card can no longer be used for SPC benefits after November 30, 2019.

References

External links
 SPC Card Website

Companies based in Vaughan
Customer loyalty programs in Canada
Sales promotion